Kotchevnik baj is a moth in the family Cossidae. It is found in central Kazakhstan.

References

Natural History Museum Lepidoptera generic names catalog

Moths described in 2011
Cossinae